Angela Aames (born Lois Marie Tlustos; February 27, 1956 – November 27, 1988) was an American actress known for her buxom blonde bombshell image.

Career
Angela Aames's first film role was as Little Bo Peep in the adult film Fairy Tales (1979). That same year, she played Linda "Boom-Boom" Bangs in the movie H.O.T.S. (1979).

Her film roles included ...All the Marbles (1981), Scarface (1983), Bachelor Party (1984), Basic Training (1985), and Chopping Mall (1986). She did guest appearances on several television shows, including Cheers (1982), and Night Court (1984).

In 1983, she appeared on Cinemax's Likely Stories, playing an  giantess.  She played a supporting role in the 1984 fantasy adventure The Lost Empire, directed by Jim Wynorski.

In the opening credits of Bachelor Party, Aames appears in a photography studio as a buxom mother having baby pictures taken with her child, along with the bachelors. She appeared in a recurring role as Penny, a fitness instructor, on The Dom DeLuise Show (1987).

Personal life
Aames married Mark Haughland.

She was found dead at a friend's home in West Hills in the San Fernando Valley on November 27, 1988. The coroner ruled that her death was a result of a deterioration of the heart muscle, probably caused by a virus.

Filmography

Movies

Television

References

External links

American film actresses
American television actresses
1956 births
1988 deaths
People from Pierre, South Dakota
20th-century American actresses
Lee Strasberg Theatre and Film Institute alumni
University of South Dakota alumni